Giovanni Orlando (born 2 February 1945) is a retired Italian freestyle swimmer who competed at the 1964 Olympics. He was part of the Italian 4 × 200 m relay team that finished eighth, and was eliminated in the heats of the 200 m individual freestyle race.

References

1945 births
Living people
Italian male freestyle swimmers
Swimmers at the 1964 Summer Olympics
Olympic swimmers of Italy
Universiade medalists in swimming
Universiade bronze medalists for Italy
Medalists at the 1963 Summer Universiade
20th-century Italian people